() or , is an apparition of Welsh mythology, dressed in white, and is most commonly seen at Hollantide and the festival of Calan Gaeaf.  Known in Welsh oral tradition, she is evoked to warn children about bad behaviour. Y Ladi Wen is characterized in various ways including being a terrifying ghost who may ask for help if you speak to her, or she may offer treasure or gold.

 is commonly connected with the villages of Ogmore, Ewenny (where she gives her name to White Lady's Meadow and White Lady's Lane) and St Athan.

Ogmore Castle
 is commonly associated with Ogmore, Bridgend. Here, a spirit was long said to wander the area until a man finally had the courage to approach her. When such a man eventually did so, the spirit led him to a treasure (a cauldron filled with gold) hidden under a heavy stone within the old tower of Ogmore Castle, and allowed the man to take half the treasure for himself. However, the man later returned and took the more of the treasure. This angered the spirit, who, with her fingers turning into claws, attacked the man as he returned home. The man became gravely ill, but only died once he had confessed his greed. After that, an ailment known as "'s revenge" was said to befall any person who died prior to disclosing hidden treasure.

References

External links
 The Legend of Ogmore Castle at bridgend.gov.uk

Welsh mythology